Punta Carneros is an island located in the Salinas County, in the Santa Elena Province of Ecuador. The name, "Ram Point" in English, stems from the rocky headland located at the southeast end of the beach.

Surfing at Punta Carneros Beach
 Surfing is a popular activity at Punta Carneros Beach due to the quality of the surf from the rocks to the dock. The beach has been chosen many times to be the venue of  national and international surfing competitions. The beach is located only 10 minutes to the south of Salinas, Ecuador, and was the site of the ISA World Junior Surfing Games Ecuador in 2009.

Punta Carneros Beach
Punta Carneros Beach is surrounded by thick coastal vegetation. The beach extends for approximately 1.6 miles (2.57 kilometers) with white to gray sand. 

Many who travel to Punta Carneros also visit other famous beaches that are found just off the coast of Ecuador in the Galápagos Islands, which are areas of the volcanic islands distributed around the equator in the Pacific Ocean.

Other activities
Whale watching is another popular activity, especially during the mating season of humpback whales, which is from June to October.  There are many boats for hire that specializes in giving exclusive tours with expert guides. Parasailing & Birdwatching are also popular activities.

External links
 Beach Information at Ecuador
 Punta Carneros Web Site at puntacarnero.com.
 wannasurf.com Punta Carneros
 surfosmagazine.com Punta Carneros

Surfing locations in Ecuador
Beaches of Ecuador
Geography of Santa Elena Province
Tourist attractions in Santa Elena Province